The Essential Fleetwood Mac is a comprehensive compilation of recordings from British blues rock band Fleetwood Mac's early recordings made with Blue Horizon Records. It includes most of the tracks from their first two albums Fleetwood Mac and Mr. Wonderful, plus non-album singles and a few rarities. The album is part of the ongoing Sony BMG series The Essential. The album was released in 2007.

Track listing
CD 1
"Black Magic Woman" 2:54
"Albatross" 3:12
"Long Grey Mare" 2:16
"No Place to Go" 3:22
"Merry-Go-Round" 4:09
"Watch Out" 4:15
"My Baby's Good to Me" 2:52
"Looking for Somebody" 2:52
"Coming Home" 2:38
"World's in a Tangle" 5:04
"If You Be My Baby" 3:54
"Worried Dream" 5:24
"Trying So Hard to Forget" 4:48
"Need Your Love Tonight" 3:29
"I Loved Another Woman" 2:57
"Love That Burns" 5:01
 
CD 2  
"Dust My Broom" 2:54
"Rollin' Man" 2:54
"Lazy Poker Blues" 2:37
"I Believe My Time Ain't Long" 2:57
"Shake Your Moneymaker" 2:57
"Cold Black Night" 3:17
"Got to Move" 3:21
"Stop Messin' Round" 2:22
"Rockin' Boogie" 3:49
"Talk with You" 3:26
"Doctor Brown" 3:46
"Jigsaw Puzzle Blues" 1:36
"Like Crying" 2:31
"The World Keep on Turning" 2:30
"My Heart Beat Like a Hammer" 2:59
"Need Your Love So Bad" 6:13

Release history

References

External links
Fleetwood Mac - The Essential Fleetwood Mac (2 CD) at Discogs

Fleetwood Mac compilation albums
2007 compilation albums
Albums produced by Mike Vernon (record producer)
Columbia Records compilation albums
Sony BMG compilation albums